The 2012 Andy Murray tennis season officially began at the Brisbane International. After overcoming slow starts in his first two matches, Murray made it to the final, defeating Alexandr Dolgopolov in straight sets to claim his 22nd career title. Murray then made it to the final of the Dubai Tennis Championships defeating Novak Djokovic in the semifinals, only to lose to Roger Federer in the final. After a loss in his opening match in Indian Wells, Murray made it to the final of the Miami Masters for the second time, where he was ultimately defeated by Djokovic in the final. Murray's clay court season was hampered by a back injury, meaning he didn't make it beyond the quarterfinals of any event, ultimately losing to David Ferrer in the last eight at Roland Garros. During the summer, Murray made it to his first ever final at Wimbledon, in which he was ultimately defeated by Federer in four sets. Murray however made his most impressive of comebacks from a Grand Slam final defeat, at the London Olympics four weeks later, staged once again at the All-England Club. Murray made it through to the final with ease, including a straight sets defeat of Novak Djokovic, to set up a rematch with Federer, once again on Wimbledon Centre Court. In a complete reversal of fortunes, Murray defeated Federer over five sets for the first time, handing the Swiss his worst defeat ever on grass to take the gold medal in straight sets, for the loss of just 7 games. 

It was during the American hardcourt season that Murray recorded his most significant victory. After retiring early in Toronto, and suffering a third round defeat by Milos Raonic in Cincinnati, Murray made his way to New York for the 2012 US Open at Flushing Meadows. The scot made it to his second consecutive Grand Slam final, where once again he faced Novak Djokovic, the fifth time the two had met in 2012. After losing a two sets to love lead, Murray regained his prior momentum to take the deciding set, and clinch his first ever Grand Slam victory. In winning the US Open, Murray became the first British man to win a Grand Slam title in 76 years, the last winner being Fred Perry in 1936. His victory at Flushing Meadows also set several records for Murray, the final featured the longest ever tiebreak in a US Open final (12-10 was the score in the first set tiebreak), and the match itself was the joint longest in history (tied with the 1988 final, in which Murray's coach Ivan Lendl competed). In addition, Murray also became the first man ever to win Olympic Gold and the US Open in the same calendar year.

All matches
This table chronicles all the matches of Murray in 2012, including walkovers (W/O) which the ATP does not count as wins. They are marked ND for non-decision or no decision.

Singles matches

Doubles matches

Mixed Doubles matches

Yearly Records

Head-to-head matchups
Ordered by number of wins
(Bold denotes a top 10 player at the time of match, Italic means top 50)

  Marcos Baghdatis 3–0
  Tomáš Berdych 3–1
  Novak Djokovic 3–4
  Marin Čilić 2–0
  Alexandr Dolgopolov 2–0
  Santiago Giraldo 2–0
  Ivo Karlović 2–0
  Mikhail Kukushkin 2–0
  Jarkko Nieminen 2–0
  Jo-Wilfried Tsonga 2–0
  Stanislas Wawrinka 2–0
  Roger Federer 2–3
  Nicolás Almagro 1–0
  Julien Benneteau 1–0
  Michael Berrer 1–0
  Alex Bogomolov, Jr. 1–0
  Marco Chiudinelli 1–0
  Flavio Cipolla 1–0
  Nikolai Davydenko 1–0
  Ivan Dodig 1–0
  Alejandro Falla 1–0
  Ryan Harrison 1–0
  Tatsuma Ito 1–0
  Lukáš Lacko 1–0
  Michaël Llodra 1–0
  Feliciano López 1–0
  Paul-Henri Mathieu 1–0
  Florian Mayer 1–0
  Gilles Müller 1–0
  David Nalbandian 1–0
  Kei Nishikori 1–0
  Sergiy Stakhovsky 1–0
  Radek Štěpánek 1–0
  Janko Tipsarević 1–0
  Bernard Tomic 1–0
  Viktor Troicki 1–0
  David Ferrer 1–1
  Richard Gasquet 1–1
  Milos Raonic 1–2
  Jérémy Chardy 0–1
  Guillermo García-López 0–1
  Jerzy Janowicz 0–1
  Nicolas Mahut 0–1

Finals

See also
2012 Novak Djokovic tennis season
2012 Roger Federer tennis season
2012 Rafael Nadal tennis season
2012 ATP World Tour

References

External links
 
2012 Schedule at ATP Tour
2012 Schedule at Official Site 

2012
Murray tennis season
Medalists at the 2012 Summer Olympics
Tennis players at the 2012 Summer Olympics
2012 in British sport